The Kubnya (Kĕtne; , Göbenä) is a river in Chuvashia and Tatarstan, Russian Federation, a left-bank tributary of the Sviyaga.

A major tributary is the Uryum. Drainage is regulated. Since 1978 it is protected as a natural monument of Tatarstan.

References 

Rivers of Chuvashia
Rivers of Tatarstan